Charles Brook is a settlement in Newfoundland and Labrador, Canada.

Populated places in Newfoundland and Labrador